Merwin Mondesir (born February 21, 1976) is a Canadian actor. He is of Saint Lucian descent. He resides in Toronto, Ontario, Canada.

Selected filmography

Film
 1997 Critical Care as Head Injury
 2000 Steal This Movie! as Private Kendall
 2000 Seventeen Again as Todd
 2001 Bones as Bill Peet
 2003 The Recruit as Stan
 2004 Against the Ropes as Street Crony
 2004 Godsend as Maurice
 2004 Noel as Glenn
 2005 Plague City: SARS in Toronto as Rob Connell
 2007 How She Move as Niko Niles
 2008 Lost Boys: The Tribe as Erik
 2010 Smokin' Aces 2: Assassins' Ball as FBI Agent Osterberg
 2011 Grave Encounters as T.C. Gibson
 2012 Cold Blooded as Nestor Grimes
 2014 The Big Fat Stone as Mugger
 2016 It Stains the Sands Red as Nick
 2019 Code 8 as Jules

Television
 1996-1998 Straight Up as Dennis
 1997-2000 Riverdale as Gordon Johnson
 2000 Drop the Beat as Dennis "Ballistic"
 2001-2002 The Ripping Friends as "Slab"
 2006 Noah's Arc as "Dre"
 2012 Rookie Blue as Roland Jones ("June 7")
 2014 Defiance as Mahsuvus Gorath (2 episodes)
 2017 In Contempt as Loftin Dubar

References

External links
Merwin Mondesir profile by Anne Marie Aikins

1976 births
Living people
Black Canadian male actors
Canadian male film actors
Canadian male television actors
Canadian male voice actors
Canadian people of Saint Lucian descent
Male actors from Toronto